Aisling Clíodhnadh O'Sullivan (born 16 March 1984), known professionally as Aisling Bea, is an Irish comedian, actor and writer. She created, wrote and starred in the comedy series This Way Up on Channel 4. As a stand-up comedian, she won the "So You Think You're Funny?" award at the Edinburgh Fringe Festival in 2012, being only the second woman to win the award in its then twenty-five year history. She also regularly appears on light entertainment comedy panel shows such as QI and 8 Out of 10 Cats.

Early life and education
Bea was born in Kildare, Ireland. Her father, Brian, was a horse veterinarian who died by suicide when Bea was three years old; she was not told how he had died until she was 13. She adopted the stage surname "Bea" as a tribute to her father, taking it from a short form of his first name. Bea and her younger sister, Sinéad, were raised by their mother, Helen (née Moloney), a secondary school teacher who had previously trained jockeys at the Racing Academy and Centre of Education and was herself a professional jockey. Her family was "obsessed" with horses and race meetings. In her youth, Bea worked as a tour guide at the Irish National Stud, but knew from a young age that she was not interested in the horse racing industry and instead loved performing. Her great-aunt was playwright Siobhán Ní Shúilleabháin, and musician Liam O'Flynn was a family friend.

Bea was educated at Presentation Secondary School, Kildare Town, a Catholic school, and studied French and philosophy at Trinity College Dublin. While there, she was part of a student sketch comedy group. She then studied at the London Academy of Music and Dramatic Art (LAMDA).

Career
After graduating from drama school, Bea spent two years trying to get work in theatre as a dramatic actress. Instead, she was cast mainly in comedic television series including Cardinal Burns and Dead Boss (both 2012). While filming Dead Boss in 2011, Bea decided to try stand-up comedy. In 2012, she won The Gilded Balloon So You Think You're Funny award at the Edinburgh Festival Fringe and, in 2013, was nominated for Best Newcomer at the Edinburgh Comedy Awards for her show C'est La Bea.

The exposure brought by these awards and festival appearances marked a "turning point" in Bea's career and she began to appear as a regular guest on panel shows including QI and Insert Name Here. Bea and Yasmine Akram co-wrote and co-hosted the BBC Radio 4 comedy folklore series Micks and Legends (2012, 2015); it was nominated for a Chortle Award in 2013. Bea won the 2014 British Comedy Award for Best Female TV Comic and returned to Edinburgh in 2015 with the live show Plan Bea. In 2016, she became a team captain on 8 Out of 10 Cats and was a cast member on Taskmaster in 2017.

Bea has continued to act in television sitcoms including Trollied (2014–2015), The Delivery Man (2015), and Amy Huberman's Irish television series Finding Joy (2018).  Additionally, she has acted in the crime dramas The Fall (2016) and Hard Sun (2018). In 2018, she and Sara Pascoe began to co-host the BBC Radio 2 comedy chat show What's Normal? She recorded a 15-minute stand-up special that was aired on Netflix in late 2018.

She stars in the Netflix comedy-drama series Living with Yourself (2019), and is the star and head writer of the Channel 4 comedy series This Way Up (2019–present). She also appeared in the ITV drama series Quiz (2020).

For her work on This Way Up, Bea won the BAFTA 2020 British Academy Television Craft Award for Breakthrough Talent.

She appeared as Sarah in the 2022 Doctor Who New Year's special "Eve of the Daleks".

Activism

Bea was a vocal supporter of the Repeal the 8th campaign in the successful 2018 Irish referendum to introduce legal abortion in the Republic of Ireland, including contributing an essay to Una Mullally's Repeal the 8th a month before the vote. She previously campaigned for same-sex marriage legislation in the successful 2015 Irish referendum.

Filmography

Acting

Stand-up comedy

Panel show appearances
Since 2016, Bea has been a team captain on 8 Out of 10 Cats, having previously been a guest on the show in 2013 and 2014. She has made guest appearances on many other panel shows, including:

References

External links

 
 
 
 

21st-century Irish actresses
21st-century Irish women writers
Irish television actresses
Irish stand-up comedians
Irish women comedians
Irish comedy writers
Irish women activists
Irish abortion-rights activists
Irish LGBT rights activists
Alumni of Trinity College Dublin
Actresses from County Kildare
1984 births
Living people
People from Kildare (town)
Women civil rights activists